Alicia "Alice" Armendariz (born November 7, 1958) is an American punk rock singer better known as Alice Bag. She is the lead vocalist and co-founder of the Bags, one of the first punk bands to form in Los Angeles in the mid-1970s. Her first book, Violence Girl: From East LA Rage to Hollywood Stage, tells the story of her childhood in East Los Angeles, her eventual move to Hollywood, and the euphoria and fallout from the first punk wave.

Bag has remained active in music since the late 1970s and released her second book in 2015. She released Alice Bag, her debut solo album on Don Giovanni Records in June 2016. A second solo album, Blueprint, was released in 2018, followed by 2020's Sister Dynamite.

Early life and education 
Bag was born and raised in East Los Angeles, California. Her father, Manuel Armendariz, was a self-employed carpenter who worked for a time in the Bracero program, and her mother, Candelaria "Candy" Armendariz, was a homemaker. Both of her parents were from Mexico. Candy had five children from her first marriage, which ended after the death of her first husband. She had an older half-sister, Yolanda.

As a child, Bag was influenced by the music played by her family, including her father's ranchera music and sister's soul music collections. As a member of the punk rock band the Bags, Alice was at the forefront of the L.A. punk rock scene in the late 1970s. Though punk rock is seen as a predominantly white male genre in the mainstream light, Bag describes the early movement as an extremely welcoming community open to everyone, especially to women.

Bag was a victim of bullying throughout her adolescence. During her middle school and high school years, she was picked on for her weight, her teeth, and her physical appearance. As a result she was often alone, and this influenced her taste in music such as Queen, David Bowie and Elton John. After transferring high schools, she was often called "Ziggy" after David Bowie's persona.

After receiving her bachelor's degree in philosophy from California State University, Los Angeles, Bag began working as an English teacher in inner-city L.A. schools.

Career 

Bag is best known for being a member of the Bags, one of the first bands on the L.A. punk scene. The Bags were notable for having two female lead musicians (the group was co-founded by Bag and school friend Patricia Morrison) and for pioneering an aggressive sound and style which has been cited as an early influence on what would become the hardcore punk sound. The band's aggressive sound was later noted to have a Mexican/Chicano influence, which Bag unintentionally incorporated from her childhood. Members of the Bags appeared as the Alice Bag Band in director Penelope Spheeris's landmark 1981 documentary on the Southern California punk scene, The Decline of Western Civilization. As a lead singer of the Bags, she pioneered the first wave of California punk alongside Black Flag, X, the Germs, Phranc (then in Catholic Discipline), and the five musicians who would go on to form the Go-Go's. Bag went on to appear and perform in other Los Angeles–based rock bands including Castration Squad, The Boneheads, Alarma, Cambridge Apostles, Swing Set, Cholita – the Female Menudo (with her friend and collaborator, performance artist Vaginal Davis), Las Tres, Goddess 13 (the subject of a KCET/PBS produced documentary, "Chicanas in Tune") and Stay at Home Bomb.

Later in Bag's career, she founded the "punk-chera" genre, fusing aspects of punk and ranchera performances.

Music 
Alice Bag began singing professionally at the age of 8, recording theme songs for cartoons in both English and Spanish. She did not gain exposure until forming the Bags. Alice collaborated with Patricia Morrison and Margo Reyes in what they first called Mascara, then Femme Fatale, which ultimately evolved into the Bags. The Bags were active from years 1977–1981. They released a single "Survive" along with "Babylonian Gorgon".

The Bags Songs included:
 Survive (single)
 Babylonian Gorgon (single)
 Gluttony
 TV Dinner
 Why Tomorrow?
 We Don't Need the English
 Animal Call
 Chainsaw
 We Will Bury You
 Violent Girl
 Disco's Dead
 Sanyo Theme
The Bags broke up by the year 1981, which then led Alice Bag to join the band Cholita in the late 80's. The Bags were renamed the Alice Bag Band for the release of The Decline of Western Civilization, after Alice Bag and partner Patricia Morrison had a dispute about who had the right to use the band name. Following the birth of her daughter in the mid-90s, Alice Bag made the choice to take a break from the music industry and become a stay-at-home mother. Soon after, she started her current project, Stay at Home Bomb. Stay at Home Bomb is an all-female community centered around punk rock that exists to address social constraints that are put on women both domestically as well as musically. The band features Alice Bag as Mothra Stewart on vocals, guitar and washboard, Judy Cocuzza as Judy Polish on drums, pots and pans, Lysa Flores as Lady Licuadora on vocals, guitar and blenders and Sharon Needles on vocals and bass guitar.

In 2016, Alice Bag released her debut solo album, Alice Bag, on punk label Don Giovanni Records. A second album, Blueprint, followed in early 2018, and featured numerous guest musicians including Allison Wolfe and Kathleen Hanna. Wolfe and Hanna were featured on the track "77", which refers to the unequal pay that women receive for the same work as men. Another song on Blueprint, "Se Cree Joven", features backing vocals from Teri Gender Bender and Francisca Valenzuela.

In 2020 another album, entitled Sister Dynamite, was released by In the Red Records on April 24, 2020.

Writing 
Bag's memoir, Violence Girl, From East LA Rage to Hollywood Stage – A Chicana Punk Story, was published by Feral House in fall 2011. Bag was inspired to write Violence Girl after attending a comic-con with her daughter in 2008. Her memoir is a compilation of short stories that sets the stage for her desire to be a punk artist. Her book contains stories of entering the punk rock scene at a time that was more inviting for women musicians. Violence Girl also reveals how domestic abuse fueled her desire for female empowerment and sheds a new perspective on the origin of hardcore, a style most often associated with white suburban males. The confrontational style of Alice Bag's performances take direction from witnessing domestic abuse as a child. Bag channeled deeply rooted personal trauma into power on stage, refusing to be victimized or oppressed by men. Through punk music, Alice realized the extent to which she had internalized witnessing violence as a child, and she worked to overcome using violence as a mode of releasing rage. Music became both a process of healing her wounds and a way to extend power and support to her community.

Since 2004, Bag has also maintained a digital archive of interviews with women who were involved in the first wave of the Southern California punk scene in the 1970s, including musicians, writers, and photographers. The archive also includes newspaper and magazine clippings, photos, and postcards relating to LA punk.

Activism 

Bag was the keynote speaker at the 2012 Women Who Rock: Making Scenes Building Communities (un)Conference in Seattle, Washington. A collection of various speakers and activities meant to empower and inspire not only Latina women, but women of every ethnicity, Alice Bag discussed her rough childhood and touched on points from her biography, Violence Girl. She sang alongside both The Januariez, a local band, and Medusa, a well-known emcee and hip hop artist. Bag explained at the 2014 Women Who Rock (un)Conference that the place for punk in the feminist movement is to continue to challenge; punk is meant to draw attention to things that are wrong in society: "We don't live in a post racism, post feminism, post anything; punk allows us to speak our minds."

She was also a part of the panel in the 2014 Women Who Rock (un)Conference.

Personal life 
Bag currently maintains part-time residency in Los Angeles, California and Mexico City. She remains musically active and collaborates with artists including Teresa Covarrubias, Lysa Flores, Martin Sorrondeguy, Allison Wolfe and others. She has recently begun exhibiting her oil paintings in gallery showings.

Bag began filming and sharing workout videos on Instagram, YouTube, and Facebook during the COVID-19 pandemic.

She is bisexual.

Discography

Solo albums 
Alice Bag (2016)
Blueprint (2018)
Sister Dynamite (2020)

Alice Bag and the Sissybears 
Alice Bag and the Sissybears (2017), pressing limited to 500

Bags 
Singles
Survive (1978)
Disco's Dead (2003)

Collections
All Bagged Up: The Collected Works 1977–1980 (2007)

Works and publications 
Books
 
 
Journals

References

External links 

 

1958 births
20th-century American women singers
21st-century American women singers
American musicians of Mexican descent
American punk rock singers
Schoolteachers from California
American women educators
Chicana feminists
Don Giovanni Records artists
Women punk rock singers
Hispanic and Latino American musicians
Living people
People from East Los Angeles, California
Feminist musicians
20th-century American singers
Hispanic and Latino American women singers
Women in punk
American archivists
20th-century American women writers
21st-century American women writers
American memoirists
Bisexual women
Bisexual musicians